This is the complete order of battle of opposing forces at the Battle of Balaclava.

Allied Army
The Allied Army consisted of British and French troops as well as Turkish formations under British command.

British Army
 Headquarters - General Lord Raglan
 Lieutenant-General on staff - Lieutenant-General Sir John Burgoyne
 Quartermaster-General - Brigadier-General Richard Airey
 Adjutant-General - Brigadier-General James Bucknall Bucknall Estcourt
 Commander, Royal Artillery - Brigadier-General Thomas Fox-Strangways
 Commander, Royal Engineers - Captain John William Gordon
 Cavalry Division - under Lieutenant-General George Bingham, 3rd Earl of Lucan with a total force of 1,500 sabres and 6 field guns.
 Heavy Cavalry Brigade - Brigadier-General James Scarlett
 4th Dragoon Guards - Lieutenant-Colonel Edward Hodge
 5th Dragoon Guards - Captain Adolphus Burton
 1st Dragoons - Lieutenant-Colonel John Yorke
 2nd Dragoons - Lieutenant-Colonel Henry Griffith
 6th Dragoons - Lieutenant-Colonel Henry White
 Light Cavalry Brigade - Major-General James Brudenell, 7th Earl of Cardigan
 4th Light Dragoons - Brevet Colonel Lord George Paget
 8th Hussars - Lieutenant-Colonel Frederick Shewell
 11th Hussars - Lieutenant-Colonel John Douglas
 13th Light Dragoons - Captain John Oldham
 17th Lancers - Captain William Morris
 Royal Horse Artillery
 I Troop - Captain George Maude

 1st Division - Lieutenant-General Prince George, Duke of Cambridge with 4,000 men.
 1st Guards Brigade - Major-General Henry Bentinck
 3rd Battalion Grenadier Guards - Brevet Colonel Edward Birch Reynardson
 1st Battalion Coldstream Guards - Brevet Colonel George Upton
 1st Battalion Scots Fusiliers Guards - Brevet Colonel Edward Forestier-Walker
 2nd Highland Brigade - Brevet Colonel Duncan Cameron
 42nd Highlanders - Brevet Lieutenant-Colonel Thomas Tulloch
 79th Highlanders - Lieutenant-Colonel John Douglas
 Royal Artillery - Lieutenant-Colonel Richard Dacres
 A Field Battery (2nd Company, 8th Battalion) - Captain David Paynter
 H Field Battery (5th Company, 11th Battalion) - Captain Edward Wodehouse
 4th Division - Lieutenant-General Sir George Cathcart with 5,000 men.
 1st Brigade - Brigadier-General Thomas Goldie
 20th Foot - Brevet Colonel Frederick Horn
 21st Foot - Lieutenant-Colonel Frederick Ainslie
 57th Foot - Brevet Lieutenant-Colonel Thomas Powell
 2nd Brigade - Brigadier-General Arthur Torrens
 2 companies, 46th Foot - Captain William Hardy
 63rd Foot - Lieutenant-Colonel Exham Swyny
 68th Foot - Lieutenant-Colonel Henry Smyth
 1st Battalion The Rifle Brigade - Brevet Lieutenant-Colonel Alfred Horsford
 Royal Artillery - Lieutenant-Colonel David Wood
 P Field Battery (4th Company, 12th Battalion) - Brevet Major Samuel Townsend
 Balaclava defences - Major-General Sir Colin Campbell with 4,000 men and 35 naval and field guns.
 93rd Highlanders - Lieutenant-Colonel William Ainslie
 Battalion of Detachments - Brevet Lieutenant-Colonel Burton Daveney
 Royal Marine Brigade - Acting Colonel Thomas Hurdle
 1st Composite Battalion, Royal Marines - Captain William Hopkins
 2nd Composite Battalion, Royal Marines - Captain Richard Meheux
 Artillery
 5 batteries, Royal Marine Artillery - Captain George Alexander
 W Field Battery (1st Company, 11th Battalion) - Captain George Barker
 Attached Turkish Army forces - Lewa Rustem Pasha
 8 infantry battalions and artillery
Reference:

French Army
Commanded by General François Certain Canrobert.
 1re Brigade de Cavalerie - General d'Allonville with 1,500 sabres.
 
 
 Corps d'Observation - General Pierre Bosquet
 1re Brigade d'Infanterie - General Charles-Marie-Esprit Espinasse
 
 
 
 2e Brigade d'Infanterie - General Joseph Vinoy with 4,000 men.

Russian Army
Commanded by Prince Aleksandr Sergeyevich Menshikov with a total of 25,000 men and 78 guns.
 Cavalry - Lt. Gen. I.I. Ryzhov with 3,000 sabres and 16 guns.
 Kiev Regiment
 Ingermanland Regiment
 (No.)1 Ural Cossacks
 North Column - Col. A.P. Skiuderi with 4,000 men and 12 guns.
 Odessa Regiment
 (No.)53 Don Cossacks
 (No.)4 Rifle Battalion (1 company)
 Left Center Column - Maj. Gen. K.R. Semiakin with 5,000 men and 10 guns.
 Azov Regiment
 Dnieper Regiment
 (No.)4 Rifle Battalion (1 company)
 Right Center Column - Maj. Gen. F.G. Levutski with 3,000 men and 8 guns.
 Ukraine Regiment
 South Column - Maj. Gen. S.I. Gribbe with 3,000 men and 10 guns
 Dnieper Regiment
 Composite Uhlan Regiment
 Ingermanland Regiment
 (No.)60 Don Cossacks
 Forward Reserves - Maj. Gen. O.P. Zhaboritski with 5,000 men and 10 guns.
 Vladimir Regiment
 Susdal Regiment
 (No.)6 Rifle Battalion
 Ingermanland Regiment (two squadrons)
 (No.)60 Don Cossacks (two sotnias)
 Reserves - total of 2,000 men and 12 guns.
 Ukraine Regiment (1 squadron)
 (No.)4 Rifle Battalion (1 company)
 Composite Uhlan Regiment

Citations

References

 

Balaclava Campaign
Crimean War